Tarzelu (also Romanized as Ţarzelū) is a village in Baranduzchay-ye Jonubi Rural District, in the Central District of Urmia County, West Azerbaijan Province, Iran. At the 2006 census, its population was 18, in 6 families.

See also 

 Tarzi Afshar

References 

Populated places in Urmia County